Dalibor Nedić (born 10 November 1974) is a Bosnian retired football player.

Club career
He had a 5-year spell in Iceland, with second tier Víkingur Ólafsvík and third tier BÍ/Bolungarvík.

International career
Nedić made his debut for Bosnia and Herzegovina in a January 1999 friendly match away against Malta and has earned a total of 8 caps (2 unofficial), scoring no goals. His final international was a January 2001 Millennium Super Soccer Cup match against Serbia and Montenegro.

References

External links

Profile - NFSBIH

1974 births
Living people
Footballers from Sarajevo
Association football defenders
Bosnia and Herzegovina footballers
Bosnia and Herzegovina international footballers
FK Olimpik players
FK Rudar Kakanj players
NK Brotnjo players
NK Zadar players
NK Čelik Zenica players
FK Sarajevo players
Ungmennafélagið Víkingur players
Vestri (football club) players
NK SAŠK Napredak players
Premier League of Bosnia and Herzegovina players
Croatian Football League players
1. deild karla players
2. deild karla players
First League of the Federation of Bosnia and Herzegovina players
Bosnia and Herzegovina expatriate footballers
Expatriate footballers in Croatia
Bosnia and Herzegovina expatriate sportspeople in Croatia
Expatriate footballers in Iceland
Bosnia and Herzegovina expatriate sportspeople in Iceland